Shamus is a 1973 American comedy thriller film directed by Buzz Kulik, and starring Burt Reynolds and Dyan Cannon. The word "shamus" means "detective" in Yiddish.

Plot summary
New York private detective Shamus McCoy is called to the house of Hume, an eccentric diamond dealer, and is given the task of recovering some stolen diamonds. His investigation is thwarted at every turn and it is only when he is beaten by a gang of thugs to warn him off the job that he realizes that he's onto something really big. Using his friend Springy as well as Alexis Montaigne, the sister of a nightclub owner, McCoy digs for the truth about the robbery. The trail leads to an Army colonel called Hardcore who is in cahoots with Alexis's brother, then full circle to Hume, who is behind the plot all along.

Cast
 Burt Reynolds as Shamus McCoy
 Dyan Cannon as Alexis Montaigne
 John Ryan as "Hardcore"
 Joe Santos as Lieutenant Promuto
 Giorgio Tozzi as Dottore
 Ron Weyand as E.J. Hume
 Larry Block as "Springy"
 Beeson Carroll as Bolton
 Kevin Conway as The Kid
 Kay Frye as Bookstore Girl
 John Glover as Johnnie

Production

Development
The film was produced by Robert M. Weitman, who had a multi-picture deal with Columbia, the first of which was The Anderson Tapes. Reynolds' signing was announced in February 1972. By this stage Buzz Kulik was attached as director and Sam Pessim was writing the script.

Weitman had known Reynolds since the 1960s when he tried to get the actor to appear in a TV series The Lieutenant. Weitman discovered Barry Beckerman's script when he was at MGM in the 1960s. It was then set in the 1940s. Weitman took the script with him when he went to Columbia and set it up as his second film there, getting Beckerman to rewrite it so it was set in the 1970s. Steve McQueen was suggested for the lead but Weitman wanted to go with Reynolds. "To me", he said, "Burt had always worked. I looked at things he'd done and said 'He's funny. He throws away lines like a Kleenex. He was like a hidden iceberg'."

It was the first film Reynolds signed for since publication of the Cosmo centerfold.

Dyan Cannon had been in semi-retirement since her bad experience on Such Good Friends but agreed to make the film after seeing Reynolds perform on stage in The Rainmaker. "It's Bogart and Bacall all over again", said Weitman.

Filming locations
Filmed in New York City, military scenes filmed at Headquarters 1/101 Cavalry NYARNG (New York Army National Guard) located at 321 Manor Road, Staten Island, New York. End credits mention special thanks to The 42nd Division (Rainbow Division) 1/101 Cavalry

During filming Reynolds was mobbed by 3,000 fans.

Military vehicles
The "combat ready" (not props) vehicles featured in these scenes – Medium Tank M48A1, Armored Personnel Carrier (APC) M113, Command Track M577 and Truck Cargo 5 ton 6X6 M54. Other vehicles in the background Truck, Utility 4X4 M106 Recoilless Rifle, Truck, Wrecker 6X6 5 ton M62, Truck Cargo 2 1/2 ton 6x6 M211, Truck Cargo 2/12 ton 6X6 M35A2

Reception
Variety wrote a negative review of Shamus stating that the film is "confusing...scripter Barry Beckerman drags in an assortment of mostly unexplained characters but some dandy rough work – and finales in a fine fog. Perhaps something was lost in translation to the screen." Roger Greenspun wrote that the film "is full of appealing New York locations and much inventive action, ultimately amounts to little more than the kind of situation melodrama that the movies these days offer for excitement. On this level it is workmanlike, well paced, modest, sometimes scary, and sometimes genuinely funny."

Burt Reynolds said it was "not a bad film, kind of cute. If the picture had been as good as the title sequence it would have made millions. As it was it made $5 million."

Sequel
Robert M. Weitman produced a TV movie about the same character titled A Matter of Wife... and Death (1976) with the role played by Rod Taylor. It was a pilot for a prospective series that did not come to be.

See also
 List of American films of 1973

References

External links

 

1973 films
1970s comedy thriller films
American mystery films
American comedy thriller films
Columbia Pictures films
American detective films
Films directed by Buzz Kulik
Films scored by Jerry Goldsmith
Films set in New York City
Films shot in New York City
American neo-noir films
1973 comedy films
1970s English-language films
1970s American films